Carlos Figueroa-Alarcón (born March 27, 1985) is a judoka from El Salvador, who competes in the -66 kg weight division.  He competed at the 2012 Summer Olympics, but was eliminated by Canada's Sasha Mehmedovic in the first round.

References 

 

1985 births
Salvadoran male judoka
Living people
Judoka at the 2011 Pan American Games
Place of birth missing (living people)
Judoka at the 2012 Summer Olympics
Olympic judoka of El Salvador
Pan American Games competitors for El Salvador